Woodstock Express (or Woodstock's Express) refers to seven roller coasters operated by Cedar Fair:

Woodstock Express (Cedar Point) at Cedar Point in Sandusky, Ohio
Woodstock Express (Carowinds) at Carowinds in Charlotte, North Carolina
Woodstock Express (Kings Island) at Kings Island near Cincinnati, Ohio
Woodstock Express (Kings Dominion) at Kings Dominion near Richmond, Virginia
Woodstock Express (Dorney Park) at Dorney Park & Wildwater Kingdom in Allentown, Pennsylvania
Woodstock Express (Michigan's Adventure) at Michigan's Adventure in Muskegon, Michigan.
Woodstock's Express (California's Great America) at California's Great America in Santa Clara, California